Stanley Coleman "Mac" McCollum (May 27, 1897 – June 23, 1973) was an American football player and coach. From 1922 to 1927, he was the head coach at the Missouri School of Mines and Metallurgy—now known as the Missouri University of Science and Technology—in Rolla, Missouri.

He played college football for Penn State. At the end of the 1921 season, he was selected by The New York Times and Princeton coach Bill Roper as one of two ends on their respective All-East football team. He was also selected by writer Lawrence Perry as a second-team end on Perry's 1921 College Football All-America Team. On December 3, 1921, he made 10 of Penn State's 11 pass receptions in a victory against Washington.

McCollum was born on May 27, 1897, in Adrian, Pennsylvania and raised in Kittanning, Pennsylvania. He moved to Mount Dora, Florida in 1967. McCollum died on June 23, 1973, at Florida Sanitarium in Orlando, Florida.

Head coaching record

References

External links
 

1897 births
1973 deaths
American football ends
Missouri S&T Miners football coaches
Penn State Nittany Lions football players
People from Kittanning, Pennsylvania
Coaches of American football from Pennsylvania
Players of American football from Pennsylvania